Basketball Club Minsk is a professional basketball club that is based in the city of Minsk, Belarus. They play in the Belarus Premier League and the VTB United League. The team plays its home games at the Minsk Arena.

Established in 2006 as BC Minsk-2006, the club has been the most successful team in Belarusian basketball. Since 2008, Tsmoki has won every Premier League title. In the 2009–10 season, Tsmoki made its European debut in the FIBA EuroChallenge. Since then, the club has participated in a European competition each season. In 2012, the club adopted its current club name Tsmoki-Minsk.

History

The club was founded in 2006, with the name of BC Minsk-2006. In September 2012, the club changed its name to BC Tsmoki-Minsk. In September 2020, Tsmoki-Minsk qualified for the Basketball Champions League (BCL) for the first time in club history after beating Neptunas in the qualifying final. As such, it became the first ever Belarusian team to play in the competition.

Logos

Players

Current roster

Notable players

 Vidas Ginevičius
 Keith Benson
 Tierre Brown

Season by season

Honours
Belarusian Premier League
Champions (14): 2009, 2010, 2011, 2012, 2013, 2014, 2015, 2016, 2017, 2018, 2019, 2020, 2021, 2022

References

External links
Official website 
Official website  
Eurobasket.com page
VTB United League team page

Basketball teams in Belarus
Sport in Minsk
Basketball teams established in 2006
2006 establishments in Belarus